Farm Cove Intermediate School is an intermediate school located in Pakuranga, Auckland. It opened in 1979. In  it had a roll of  students.

The current principal is Dr Tamara Jones. The previous principals were Linda Harvie and Madeleine East. Madeleine East served for 17 years and was named an associate member of the New Zealand Principals’ Federation in May 2007 and a member of the New Zealand Order of Merit on 1 June 2009.

The school has been awarded the MultiServe/Telecom Information Award and twice won the Goodman Fielder School of the Year Award in the large Primary/Intermediate category.

References 

Intermediate schools in Auckland